In biogeography, a land bridge is an isthmus or wider land connection between otherwise separate areas, over which animals and plants are able to cross and colonize new lands. A land bridge can be created by marine regression, in which sea levels fall, exposing shallow, previously submerged sections of continental shelf; or when new land is created by plate tectonics; or occasionally when the sea floor rises due to post-glacial rebound after an ice age.

Prominent examples 

 Adam's Bridge (also known as Rama Setu), connecting India and Sri Lanka
 The Bassian Plain, which linked Australia and Tasmania
 The Bering Land Bridge (aka Beringia), which intermittently connected Alaska (Northern America) with Siberia (North Asia) as sea levels rose and fell under the effect of ice ages
 Land bridges of Japan, several land bridges which connected Japan to Russia and Korea at various times in history.
 De Geer Land Bridge, a route that connected Fennoscandia to northern Greenland
 Doggerland, a former landmass in the southern North Sea which connected the island of Great Britain to continental Europe during the last ice age
 The Isthmus of Panama, whose appearance three million years ago allowed the Great American Biotic Interchange between North America and South America
 The Thule Land Bridge, a since disappeared land bridge between the British Isles and Greenland
 The Sinai Peninsula, linking Africa and Eurasia
 Torres Strait land bridge, Sahul, between modern-day West Papua and Cape York

Land bridge theory 

In the 19th century, scientists including Joseph Dalton Hooker noted puzzling geological, botanical, and zoological similarities between widely separated areas. To solve these problems, they proposed land bridges between appropriate land masses. In geology, the concept was first proposed by Jules Marcou in Lettres sur les roches du Jura  et leur distribution géographique dans les deux hémisphères ("Letters on the rocks of the Jura [Mountains]  and their geographic distribution in the two hemispheres"), 1857–1860.

The hypothetical land bridges included:
 Archatlantis from the West Indies to North Africa 
 Archhelenis from Brazil to South Africa
 Archiboreis in the North Atlantic
 Archigalenis from Central America through Hawaii to Northeast Asia
 Archinotis from South America to Antarctica
 Lemuria in the Indian Ocean

The theory of continental drift provided an alternate explanation that did not require land bridges. However the continental drift theory was not widely accepted until the development of plate tectonics in the early 1960s, which more completely explained the motion of continents over geological time.

See also 

 Habitat fragmentation
 Sea level rise

References

Further reading

External links 

Landforms
Historical geology
Biogeography
Bridges